WUPK (94.1 FM) is a radio station based in the Upper Peninsula of Michigan licensed to Marquette, Michigan.  The stations broadcast a soft adult contemporary format brand as 94.1 The Breeze.

WUPK signed on as a simulcast of WIMK in the 1990s, and by the 2000s, the station adopted the name "Classic Rock: The Bear", joining Northern Star's existing group of Northern Michigan stations with this branding, though their programming was not part of that specific network of stations, and aired its own music rotation.

Following the stations' sale from Northern Star Broadcasting to Sovereign Communications in 2010, WUPK broke their simulcast and re-imaged as "94 Rock" accordingly, adopting similar identities, logos, and playlists as Rock 101, Sovereign's existing active rock station in Sault Ste. Marie, Michigan at WSUE 101.3 FM. WUPK/WIMK DJ Nikki "At Night" Peterson currently provides pre-recorded station bumpers for WSUE's nighttime music rotation.

In July 2020, WUPK changed their format from active rock to soft adult contemporary, branded as "94.1 The Breeze".

Previous logo
 (WUPK's logo under "The Bear" branding)

References

Sources
Michiguide.com - WUPK History

External links

UPK-FM
Soft adult contemporary radio stations in the United States